Popatkhed Dam, is an earthfill dam on Dather river near Akot, Akola district in the state of Maharashtra in India.

Specifications
The Dam is able to replenish dried borewells as far as 15 to 20 KM

Purpose
 Irrigation

See also
 Dams in Maharashtra
 List of reservoirs and dams in India

References

Dams in Akola district
Dams completed in 2005
2005 establishments in Maharashtra